E64 may refer to:
 BMW E64, a car model in the BMW 6 Series
 European route E64, a series of roads in Italy, part of the United Nations International E-road network
 E-64, an epoxide which can irreversibly inhibit a wide range of cysteine peptidases
 King's Indian Defence, Encyclopaedia of Chess Openings code
 Tsugaru Expressway, route E64 in Japan